Geesukonda is a village and a mandal in Warangal district in the state of Telangana in India.

 List of Villages in  Geesugonda  Mandal.
Villages In Mandal
1. Anantharam 
2. Bodduchintalapalle
3. Dharmaram 
4. Elkurthy 
5. Geesugonda 
6. Gorrekunta 
7. Kommala 
8. Machapur 
9. Manugonda 
10. Mogilicherla 
11. Ookal 
12. Potharajpalle 
13. Arepalle Haveli 
14. Shayampet 
15. Stambampalle 
16. Vanchangiri 
17. Vasanthapur 
18. Viswanathpur .

References 

Villages in Warangal district
Mandals in Warangal district